Vinayak N. Kulkarni (born 11 September 1954) is a former Indian cricket umpire. He stood in two ODI games between 1999 and 2000. Later, he became an umpire's coach for the Board of Control for Cricket in India (BCCI).

See also
 List of One Day International cricket umpires

References

1954 births
Living people
Indian One Day International cricket umpires
People from Bagalkot